Diego Ferreira (born December 22, 1975) is a Paraguayan athlete specializing in the 100 metres.

Participating in the 2004 Summer Olympics, he achieved fifth place in his 100 metres heat, thus failing to make it through to the second round.

References
sports-reference

External links

1975 births
Living people
Paraguayan male sprinters
Olympic athletes of Paraguay
Athletes (track and field) at the 2003 Pan American Games
Athletes (track and field) at the 2004 Summer Olympics
Pan American Games competitors for Paraguay
World Athletics Championships athletes for Paraguay
21st-century Paraguayan people
20th-century Paraguayan people